Claudio Vinazzani (18 April 1954) is an Italian former footballer who played as a midfielder.

Career
Born in Carrara, Vinazzani began playing football with local side Massese. After several seasons in the lower levels, including spells with Carrarese and Olbia, he joined Napoli in 1976, where he would make his Serie A debut against Catanzaro on 3 October 1976.

Honours

Club
Napoli
Anglo-Italian League Cup (1): 1976

References

1954 births
Italian footballers
Serie A players
U.S. Massese 1919 players
Carrarese Calcio players
Olbia Calcio 1905 players
S.S. Lazio players
S.S.C. Napoli players
Living people
Association football midfielders